This is a list of butterflies of Bhutan. About 670 species are known from Bhutan, but it is estimated that a total of 800-900 species occurs.

References 

.
B
Bhutan
Butterflies
Bhutan
B